The Aprilia Shiver 750 is a standard motorcycle manufactured by Italian manufacturer Aprilia. The motorcycle incorporates the first Ride by Wire Technology on a production motorcycle and a 90° V-twin engine.  

The Shiver is also available as a partially faired option known as the Shiver 750 GT, which was launched in 2009.  
The instrument panel features comprehensive gauges including a gear indicator.  The 'Ride by Wire' electronic throttle has three available power settings, referred to as Sport, Touring and Rain.  Sport mode is normal, with maximum power and torque; Touring mode scales back the responsiveness; Rain mode reduces torque by 25%.

References

External links

SL750
Standard motorcycles
Motorcycles introduced in 2009